Allidiostomatinae is a subfamily of beetles in the scarab beetle family, Scarabaeidae. It is distributed in southern South America. Of the ten species, seven are endemic to Argentina. Others can also be found in Chile and Peru. Little is known about the biology of these beetles.

The subfamily was made up of the single genus Allidiostoma until 2009, when a second was erected for the new species Parallidiostoma tricornum.

Genera and species include:

 Allidiostoma
Allidiostoma bosqui
Allidiostoma halffteri
Allidiostoma hirtum
Allidiostoma landbecki
Allidiostoma monrosmuntanolae
Allidiostoma ramosae
Allidiostoma rufum
Allidiostoma simplicifrons
Allidiostoma strobeli
Parallidiostoma
Parallidiostoma tricornum

References

External links
 Allidiostoma. Tree of Life Web Project.

Scarabaeidae
Taxa named by Gilbert John Arrow